Geir Kvernmo (born 29 October 1955) is a Norwegian long-distance runner. He competed in the men's marathon at the 1988 Summer Olympics.

References

1955 births
Living people
Athletes (track and field) at the 1988 Summer Olympics
Norwegian male long-distance runners
Norwegian male marathon runners
Olympic athletes of Norway
Sportspeople from Trondheim